Eddystone is a rural locality in the local government area of Break O'Day in the North-east region of Tasmania. The 2016 census determined a population of nil for the state suburb of Eddystone.

History
Eddystone is a confirmed suburb/locality. Eddystone Point, the eastern extremity of the locality, supports a lighthouse and is known to Aboriginals as Larapuna. In 2006 the Tasmanian Government issued a 40-year lease for the Larapuna lands surrounding the lighthouse.

Geography
The Tasman Sea forms the north-eastern, eastern and south-eastern boundaries.

Road infrastructure
The C846 route (Eddystone Point Road) enters from the west and runs through to Eddystone Point, where it ends.

References

Localities of Break O'Day Council
Towns in Tasmania